Paulo César may refer to:

Caju (real name Paulo Cézar Lima), Brazilian footballer who played at the 1970 and 1974 FIFA World Cup tournaments
Paulo César Carpegiani, Brazilian footballer (1970s) / manager (1980s-90s) 
Paulo César Arruda Parente, Brazilian fullback (2000s: PSG et al.)
Paulo César Rocha Rosa Brazilian footballer for FC Braga
Paulo César Tinga, Brazilian midfielder (2000s: Grêmio et al.)
Paulo César (footballer, born 1979), Brazilian football midfielder
Paulo César Gusmão, Brazilian goalkeeper (1980s) & manager (1990s - 2000s)
Paulo César (footballer, born 1986), Hong Kong football goalkeeper
Paulo César Wanchope, Costa Rican footballer (1990s-2000s)
Paulo Cesar Farias,  Brazilian campaign treasurer of Fernando Collor de Mello